The boys' doubles of the tournament 2018 BWF World Junior Championships was held on 12–18 November. The defending champions from the last edition are Mahiro Kaneko / Yunosuke Kubota from Japan.

Seeds 

  Di Zijian / Wang Chang (champions)
  Ghifari Anandaffa Prihardika / Pramudya Kusumawardana (second round)
  Liang Weikeng / Shang Yichen (semifinals)
  Christopher Grimley / Matthew Grimley (fourth round)
  Krishna Prasad Garaga / Dhruv Kapila (third round)
  Fabien Delrue / William Villeger (third round)
  Leo Rolly Carnando / Daniel Marthin (fourth round)
  Ratchapol Makkasasithorn / Weeraphat Phakrajung (third round)

  Enrico Baroni / Giovanni Toti (third round)
  Shin Tae-yang / Wang Chan (final)
  Thanawin Madee / Wachirawit Sothon (semifinals)
  Vishnu Vardhan Goud Panjala / Srikrishna Sai Kumar Podile (quarterfinals)
  Kenji Lovang / Christo Popov (second round)
  Rory Easton / Zach Russ (third round)
  Joan Monroy / Carlos Piris (third round)
  Maxime Briot / Yanis Gaudin (third round)

Draw

Finals

Top half

Section 1

Section 2

Section 3

Section 4

Bottom half

Section 5

Section 6

Section 7

Section 8

References

2018 BWF World Junior Championships